Lubny railway station is a railway station in the Ukrainian city Lubny.

See also
Ukrzaliznytsia - the national railway company of Ukraine

References

External links

 Lubny station on Ukrzaliznytsia site (Ukrainian)
 Timetable of the station Lubny (Ukraine)

Southern Railways (Ukraine) stations
Railway stations in Poltava Oblast
Railway stations opened in 1901